Connor Bryant Scott (born October 8, 1999) is an American professional baseball outfielder in the Pittsburgh Pirates organization.

Amateur career
Scott attended Henry B. Plant High School in Tampa, Florida, where he played four years of varsity baseball. In 2018, his senior year, he struggled with a hamstring injury, forcing him to miss three weeks. Over 20 games, he batted .526 with five home runs, along with pitching to a 3–0 win–loss record and a 2.13 earned run average in 23 innings. He committed to attend the University of Florida to play college baseball for the Florida Gators.

Professional career

Miami Marlins
The Miami Marlins selected Scott in the first round, with the 13th overall pick, in the 2018 Major League Baseball draft. He signed for a $4,038,200 signing bonus, rather than attend Florida, and made his professional debut with the Gulf Coast Marlins of the Rookie-level Gulf Coast League (GCL). After 27 games in the GCL, he was promoted to the Greensboro Grasshoppers of the Class A South Atlantic League. In 50 games between the two teams, Scott batted .218 with one home run and 13 runs batted in.

Scott began 2019 with the Clinton LumberKings of the Class A Midwest League. After slashing .251/.311/.368 with four home runs, 36 RBIs, and 21 stolen bases over 95 games, he was promoted to the Jupiter Hammerheads of the Class A-Advanced Florida State League, with whom he finished the year, batting .235 with one home run over 27 games. For the 2021 season, he was assigned to the Beloit Snappers of the High-A Central, slashing .276/.333/.446 with ten home runs, 46 RBIs, and 14 stolen bases over 96 games.

Pittsburgh Pirates
On November 29, 2021, the Marlins traded Scott, Zach Thompson, and Kyle Nicolas to the Pittsburgh Pirates for Jacob Stallings. He was assigned to the Altoona Curve of the Double-A Eastern League for the 2022 season. Over 109 games, Scott slashed .247/.308/.389 with seven home runs, 49 RBIs, and 25 doubles.

References

External links

1999 births
Living people
Baseball players from Tampa, Florida
Baseball outfielders
Gulf Coast Marlins players
Greensboro Grasshoppers players
Jupiter Hammerheads players
Altoona Curve players
Henry B. Plant High School alumni